This is the discography of English beat band Freddie and the Dreamers.

Albums

Studio albums

Soundtrack albums

Compilation albums

EPs

Singles

Notes

References

Discographies of British artists
Rock music group discographies